Oleksandr Haiduk (born 11 May 1972) is a Ukrainian retired football forward.

External links
 

1972 births
Living people
Ukrainian footballers
Ukrainian expatriate footballers
Soviet footballers
Ukrainian Premier League players
FC Shakhtar Oleksandriya players
FC Ros Bila Tserkva players
FC CSKA Kyiv players
FC Khimik Severodonetsk players
FC Nyva Vinnytsia players
FC Obolon-Brovar Kyiv players
Expatriate footballers in Israel
Maccabi Petah Tikva F.C. players
Maccabi Netanya F.C. players
Expatriate footballers in Qatar
Maccabi Ahi Nazareth F.C. players
Expatriate footballers in Germany
Al-Rayyan SC players
SV Elversberg players
Association football forwards
Qatar Stars League players
Ukrainian expatriate sportspeople in Israel
Ukrainian expatriate sportspeople in Germany
Ukrainian expatriate sportspeople in Qatar